Piper is a neighborhood within Kansas City, Kansas, United States.  Before Piper was annexed in 1991, it was formerly an unincorporated semi-rural area, similar to Turner.

History
Piper was first laid out as a village in 1888. A post office was opened in Piper in 1888, and remained in operation until it was discontinued in 1971.

Education
Piper has its own school district known as Piper USD 203. It is one of four districts in Wyandotte County.  Piper High School, Piper Middle School, Piper Prairie Elementary School, Piper Creek Elementary School and the Early Childhood Center at the District Office comprise the district.  These schools are the first in the nation to have Google Fiber bandwidth.

The Piper Pirates 2012-2013 football team won its first regional bracket. Piper USD 203 shares Wyandotte County's school districts with 3 other school districts. Kansas City, Kansas City USD 500, Bonner Springs–Edwardsville USD 204, and Turner USD 202.

Notable people
 Eric Stonestreet - Actor, alumnus of Piper High School.

Further reading
 Wyandotte County and Kansas City, Kansas - Historical and Biographical; Goodspeed Publishing Co; 932 pages; 1890.

References

Neighborhoods in Kansas City, Kansas